Murom is a rural locality (a selo) and the administrative center of Muromskoye Rural Settlement, Shebekinsky District, Belgorod Oblast, Russia. The population was 1,468 as of 2010. There are 24 streets.

Geography 
Murom is located 24 km southwest of Shebekino (the district's administrative centre) by road. Arkhangelskoye is the nearest rural locality.

References 

Rural localities in Shebekinsky District